William Morton Lyon (born December 10, 1973) is a former American football defensive tackle in the National Football League who played for the Green Bay Packers and the Minnesota Vikings. Lyon played college football for Marshall University and played professionally for 6 seasons. He retired in 2003.

References

1973 births
Living people
Sportspeople from Ashland, Kentucky
Players of American football from Kentucky
American football defensive ends
American football defensive tackles
Marshall Thundering Herd football players
Green Bay Packers players
Minnesota Vikings players